The Bullfrog Road Bridge is a historic bridge between Emmitsburg, Frederick County and Taneytown, Carroll County in Maryland. The bridge crosses the Monocacy River on Bullfrog Road between the two counties. This bridge is a rare steel Parker through truss structure and is 183 feet in length and 16 feet-5 inches in width. It was built in 1908, by the York Bridge Company of York, Pennsylvania.

The Bullfrog Road Bridge was listed on the National Register of Historic Places in 1978.

References

External links
, including photo in 1977, at Maryland Historical Trust
Bullfrog Road Bridge at Bridges & Tunnels
Bullfrog Road Bridge at Bridge Hunter

Road bridges on the National Register of Historic Places in Maryland
Bridges in Frederick County, Maryland
Taneytown, Maryland
National Register of Historic Places in Carroll County, Maryland
National Register of Historic Places in Frederick County, Maryland
Steel bridges in the United States
Parker truss bridges in the United States
Monocacy River